Ppilku is a 1997 South Korean teen drama film.

Plot
Pil-gu is a high school athlete and the leader of an underground club called Shock. Along with the Shocks, the judo club and a girls' club called Sexy Wave led by Hee-jeong cause plenty of trouble and mayhem in the school. The arrival of a pretty young teacher named Yoo Yuna gets the students in gear for another big scheme. Each club sets up a strategy to lure the new teacher. After beating numerous contenders, Pil-gu approaches Yuna.

Cast

Lee Min-woo as Pil-gu
Kim Geum-yong as Yoo Yuna
Kim Ki-yeon as Hee-jeong
Hong Il-kwon as Hong-ik
Kim Seong-su as Do-sik
Won Ki-joon as Ki-chul
Lee Dae-ro as Principal
Oh He-chan as Student-in-charge
Cho Hak-ja as Guidance counselor
Kim Gyeong-jin as Female teacher
Ra Kap-sung as Seon-joo
Hong Chung-gil as Sailor
Kim Jeong-yeon as Dong-ja
Lee Dong-yeop as young Pil-gu
Kim Seong-cheol as Yong-gu
Kil Do-tae-rang as Detective squad chief
Hong Sung-young as Detective Hong
Yoo Seong as Detective Yoo
Park Jae-seok as Shock member
Bae Yong-joon as Shock member
Kim Yu-heung as Shock member
Lee Sung as Shock member
Lee Se-chang as Shock member
Kim Mun-beom as Shock member
Yu Su-mi as Sexy Wave member
Oh Yeong-mi as Sexy Wave member
Park Yu-mi as Sexy Wave member
Im Hae-won as Sexy Wave member
Park Hye-yeong as Sexy Wave member

Production
Ppilku began production in 1993 and completed filming in 1995. However, it only received a theatrical release in 1997. The movie's plot is similar to Salut D'Amour, a 1994 KBS drama series.

References

External links

1997 films
1990s Korean-language films
South Korean drama films
1990s teen drama films
1997 drama films